Thrissur C. Narendran is a Mridangam artiste from Kerala, India. His intricate rhythmic patterns, sense of proportion, sharp anticipation, short & carefully thought out phases of silence, and the ability to give the Mridangam the much-needed soft touch sets Trichur C. Narendran a apart. Narendran has also accompanied more than five generations of musicians.

Early life
Narendran was born to Late Venugopala Raja of Manakulam Palace (the royal family of Thalapilly, Thrissur, Kerala, India and Late Sarojini.V.Raja on 15 December 1951 . Narendran inherits a legacy of performing art. Manakulam Late Valiya Kunhunni Raja "Kakkad Karanavarppad", the progenitor of the Temple of performing Art of Kerala – "Kerala Kalamandalam" was his maternal grandfather. He grew up with his elder brother (violinist Thrissur C. Rajendran) and sister (vocalist Prema Balachandran) in an ambience of Music and Art.

Musical training
Born in a family of musicians and scholars, Narendran was initiated into an early training in Mridangam by Sri Kongorppilly Parameswaran Namboodiri  who spotted his talent during a dance rehearsal at an annual family get together at Manakkulam Palace, and started teaching Narendran the basics of  Mridangam when he was just seven.
It was David Bhagavathar of Kunnamkulam who instilled in him the interest in music and inspired him to seriously take up the Mridangam.  Later it was Sri E P Narayana Pisharodi and Koduvayur Radhakrishnan who trained him further.
Narendran had the rarest privileges to be one of the early disciples of Palghat R Raghu from 1973.
It was the scholarship awarded by the Government of India that provided the fecundity for him to learn the finer and the most intricate techniques of mridangam playing from Mridangam Maestro Padmashri Palghat R. Raghu.

Career 

Narendran has been exposed to the concert platform from a very early age of 10. 
He has played for Chembai Vaidyanatha Bhagavathar and K.J. Yesudas at Peringode at the age of 15 along with his elder brother Thrissur.C.Rajendran.
Narendran had the rare privilege of performing together with his guru Palghat R Raghu in the Jass Yatra Festival in Bombay in the year 1978.
From a very young age, Narendran has been accompanying throughout India with maestros like Semmangudi Srinivsa Iyer, M S Subbulakshmi, Palghat K. V. Narayanaswamy, Dr M. Balamuralikrishna, T. M. Thiagarajan, Nedunuri Krishnamurthy, Voletti Venkateswarulu, Dr S. Ramanathan, D. K. Jayaraman, M. D. Ramanathan, S. Kalyanaraman, Maharajapuram Santhanam, D. K. Pattammal, T. Brinda, M.L. Vasanthakumari, K S Narayanaswamy, T.N. Krishnan, Lalgudi Jayaraman, M.S. Gopalakrishnan, Dr S. Balachander, Dr N. Ramani, L. Subramaniam, T. Viswanathan, Jon B. Higgins, M. Chandrasekaran, V V Subramanyam, R. K. Srikantan, TR Subramaniam, T K Govinda Rao, Madurai G S Mani, T. N. Seshagopalan, Trichur V. Ramachandran, T. V. Gopalakrishnan, T. V. Sankaranarayanan, Neyyattinkara Vasudevan, K J Yesudas, O. S. Thyagarajan, Bombay Sisters, E. Gayathri, Padmavathy Ananthagopalan, Rajeswari Padmanabhan, and Karaikudi S Subramanian

He has provided accompaniment to the present day vidwans like U. Srinivas, N. Ravikiran, N Vijay Siva, P. Unnikrishnan, Sanjay Subrahmanyan,Maharajapuram S Ramachandran, T M Krishna, Sreevalsan J. Menon, Maharajapuram S Srinivasan, Sudha Raghunathan, Bombay Jayashree, Shashank Subramanyam, Palakkad R Ramaprasad,TNS Krishna, Sankaran Namboothiri,Abshek Raghuraman,Sikkil Gurucharan and so on. He also has many foreign concerts to his credit :-
1982–   USA With K S Narayanaswami
1982–   JAPAN with Dr L Subramanyam
1983–   USA – CANADA– England with K. V. Narayanaswamy
1984 TO 1986 - Taught Mridangam in SAN DIEGO STATE UNIVERSITY, CALIFORNIA,USA as a visiting professor and provided Mridangam accompaniment to the visiting artistes Sri RK srikantan and Veena Gayathri
1987–   DUBAI – MUSCAT- with K. V. Narayanaswamy
1989–   USA - DUBAI- ABUDHABI with Bombay Sisters
1995–   USA - CANADA with Padmavathi and Jayanthi
1996–   He was a part of the 50th year celebration of UNESCO in France
1997–   USA - CANADA with Bombay Jayasri
2001–   USA - CANADA With P. Unnikrishnan
2008–   GERMANY & FINLAND With Dr. Karaikudi S Subramanian & Shankari Krishnan
2015-   USA Concerts with Palakkad R Ramaprasad 
2017-   USA Concerts with Palakkad R Ramaprasad
2018-   USA Concerts with Palakkad R Ramaprasad
2018-   AUSTRALIA (Melbourne) To perform in a Violin Arangetram of Manisha Jothin disciple of Vidwan Murali Kumar
2019-    USA Concerts with Palakkad R Ramaprasad

Stint with A.I.R

It was at the age of 17 that he won first prize in A I R Music competition. In the Commercial CD released by A I R of Palghat K V Narayanaswami, with M S G on the violin, Narendran has provided mridangam accompaniment. He was a staff at All India Radio from 1992 to 2011.  He is a Top rank artiste of All India Radio.

Awards and Accolades
Thanjavur Vaidyanatha Iyer award by Sri Ragam Fine Arts  
NADAKKANAL in 1999
Maharajapuram Santhanam Foundation Meritorious award in 1999
VANI KALA SUDHAKARA by Thyagabrahma Gana Sabha in 2000
ASTHANA VIDWAN OF KANCHI MUTT in 2001
LAYAVADHYA CHATHURA BY ANNA NAGAR MUSIC CIRCLE TRUST & SADGURU SANGITA VIDYALAYA IN 2010
LAYA VIDHYADHARA by IRAIPANI MANDRUM Kottivakkam in 2011
LAYA KALAVIPANCHI From Dr M. Balamuralikrishna on 31 December 2011
MADHURA MURALI PURASKAR from legend Dr M balamuralikrishna on his 82nd birthday in 2012.
SANGEETHA THILAKAM from Thiruvambadi Devaswom in December 2012
LAYAPRATHIBHA - HARMONIAM CHAKRAVARTHY KOTTARA SANKUNNY NAIR MEMORIAL AWARD 2013 – EDAPPALLY.
DASA KALA RATHNA BY SHRI PRANDARADAASAR TRUST CHENNAI ON 1-3-2015
Dr. UMAYALPURAM SIVARAMAN AWARD FOR THE "BEST MRUDANGA VIDWAN" for the year 2014-15 on 17.12.2015.
"VALAYAPATTI" AWARD ON 24-12-2016
KALASEVA NIRATHA From Thyagaraja Vidwath Samajam on 02-05-2017
MAHARAJAPURAM MEMORIAL AWARD 2018 ON 01-01-2019
"MRIDANGA KALA SHIROMANI" PALGHAT MANI IYER MEMORIAL AWARD FROM PERCUSSIVE ARTS CENTRE PLGHAT MANI IYER ATRS CENTRE ON 14-07-2019
.VALAYAPATTI NADHAALAYA SIROMANI AWARD ON 25-12-2022

Narendran moved to Chennai in 1973. He is now retired from All India Radio and settled in Chennai.

References

Sources 
 – KutcheriBuzz.com
 – The Hindu
 -carnatica.net
 -carnaticcorner.com
 -indianewengland.com
 -Mysoorunews.com

External links

 – The Hindu

 – Starclinch
 – Veethi

1951 births
Living people
Mridangam players
All India Radio people
San Diego State University faculty
Indian percussionists
Musicians from Thrissur
20th-century Indian musicians